Seno Otway is a large inland sound lying between Brunswick Peninsula and Riesco Island in southern Chile. Alternatively called Otway Sound, this natural waterway occupies a valley blocked by a large terminal moraine left by the retreat of a glacier during the last glacial period. In spite of being located east of the Andes, it is connected to the open Pacific Ocean through the Strait of Magellan via a narrow passage, which cuts into the Andean Massif. Seno Otway also is hydrologically connected with Seno Skyring by the Fitzroy Channel.

Ecology
There are a variety of marine species within the Otway Sound, as well as along the coastal terrestrial and intertidal zones. Notably there is a moderately large colony of the Magellanic penguin along the coast of the Seno Otway.

Not to be confused with Otway Bay at the west entrance of the Abra Channel.

See also
 Fjords and channels of Chile

References
 United States Geological Survey (USGS) P 1386-I Chile and Argentina - Wet Andes: Past Glaciation  accessdate=2008-01-29
 C. Michael Hogan (2008) Magellanic Penguin, GlobalTwitcher.com, ed. N. Stromberg

Line notes

Sounds of Chile
Bodies of water of Magallanes Region